The pale spiderhunter (Arachnothera dilutior) is a species of bird in the family Nectariniidae. It is found in Palawan. It was originally considered a subspecies of the little spiderhunter.

References

Moyle, R.G., S.S. Taylor, C.H. Oliveros, H.C. Lim, C.L. Haines, M.A. Rahman, and F.H. Sheldon. 2011. Diversification of an endemic Southeast Asian genus: phylogenetic relationships of the spiderhunters (Nectariniidae: Arachnothera). Auk 128: 777–788.

pale spiderhunter
Birds of Palawan
Endemic birds of the Philippines
pale spiderhunter